Telemax is a Mexican broadcast television network based in Hermosillo, Sonora. Its flagship station is XEWH-TDT in Hermosillo, and is available nationally through satellite and cable coverage. It is also available through a network of over-the-air repeaters, which extend its flagship station's coverage throughout Sonora. Telemax is owned by the State of Sonora and its stated mission is "to promote Sonoran culture and values, the works and programs of the government, and timely and truthful broadcast of information to various social segments of the population."

History

XEWH history
The history of television station XEWH precedes that of Telemax by over 30 years. Founded November 27, 1957 by the Azcárraga family, XEWH went on the air May 30, 1959 as part of Telesistema Mexicano, hence the callsign XEWH, from "XEW", the Telesistema Mexicano flagship station in Mexico City, and "H", for Hermosillo. As typical of Telesistema Mexicano stations, XEWH operated independently, but that changed in 1969. The station became a mere retransmitter of programs from Mexico City, likely from XEW-TV, and remained so until 1978, when it was acquired by local businessmen and broke away to resume producing local programming. In 1984, the station was sold to the Sonoran government. State government decree 369 on August 22, 1985, established XEWH as the official voice of the Sonoran government. Also in 1985, the government began building a network of low-power television stations throughout Sonora to rebroadcast XEWH.

XEWH is one of the few public television stations in Mexico to operate under a commercial concession. Its transmitter is located on Cerro La Cementera in Hermosillo along with those for Hermosillo's other television stations.

In March 2018, in order to facilitate the repacking of TV services out of the 600 MHz band (channels 38-51), XEWH was assigned channel 19 for continued digital operations.

Telemax history
The year 1990 saw the launch of Telemax, a new identity for the state-run television station. The initial construction of the statewide network was coming to a close, but as Telemax, the number of stations in the network increased rapidly. Seven stations were added in 1996, and 26 more were added in 1997, bringing the number of stations to 58.

In 2015, Telemax changed its format radically to offer half-hour newscasts at the top of the hour on weekdays, as well as educational programming on weekends. The network relaunch included a new logo and slogan, #TuVozSeEscucha (Your Voice is Heard), as well as an emphasis on social media interaction. On September 8, 2015, Telemax went HD and launched 17 HD transmitters.

Programming
On weekdays Telemax's programming is heavy on news programming. The station's live shows begin at 6:30am with the morning program Despierta Sonora and for most of the day mix the half-hour newscasts (and some hour-long shows, at 2 and 8pm) with other shows focusing on topics including health and sports.

On the weekends Telemax produces no newscasts and carries large quantities of national educational programming, as well as some of its own productions like Conociendo Sonora and a Sunday Mass.

Transmitters
The following television transmitters, all owned by the Government of the State of Sonora, broadcast Telemax programming.

|-

|-

|-

|-

|-

|-

|-

|-

|-

|-

|-

|-

|-

|-

|-

|-

|-

|-

|-

|-

|-

|-

|-

|-

|-

|-

|-

|-

|-

|-

|-

|-

|-

|-

|-

|-

|-

|-

|-

|-

|-

|-

|-

|-

|-

|-

|-

|-

|-

|-

|-

|-

|-

|-

|-

|-

|-

|-

Coverage in the United States
Telemax programming also airs on a few low-power stations in the United States:

KSDI-LD 33.1, Fresno, California
KUDF-LD 14.2, Tucson, Arizona
KRMF-LD 7.5, Reno, Nevada
WEQT-LD 9.3, Atlanta, Georgia
WMMF-LD 19.13, Vero Beach, Florida

Telemax was formerly carried on KPHE-LD 44.2, Phoenix, Arizona, until that station was sold in May 2022. In mid 2022, Telemax has ceased broadcasting on KHMP-LD 18.5, Las Vegas, being replaced by another network.

References

External links
 Telemax Official Site

Television networks in Mexico
Public television in Mexico
Television stations in Sonora
Mass media in Hermosillo
Television channels and stations established in 1959